8 Pashons - Coptic calendar - 10 Pashons

Fixed commemorations
All fixed commemorations below are observed on 9 Pashons (17 May) by the Coptic Orthodox Church.

Saints
Saint Helena, (327 A.D.)
Pope John XI of Alexandria (1168 A.M.), (1452 A.D.)
Pope Gabriel VIII of Alexandria (1319 A.M.), (1601 A.D.)

Days of the Coptic calendar
Helena, mother of Constantine I